Synnøve Thoresen (born 6 May 1966) is a former Norwegian biathlete. She participated on the Norwegian team that received a silver medal in the team race in 1989. She received a bronze medal in 1991.

References

External links

1966 births
Living people
Norwegian female biathletes
Biathlon World Championships medalists
20th-century Norwegian women